William Mounsey may refer to:

 William Mounsey (Royal Navy officer) (1766–1830), British officer of the Royal Navy
 William Mounsey (bishop) (1867–1952), Bishop of Labuan and Sarawak, 1909–1916
 William H. Mounsey (1808–1877), British soldier and antiquarian